Joel Bennett Ringer (born 2 November 1996) is a Welsh professional rugby union player. Ringer currently plays rugby union for RGC 1404 after joining from Rugby Club Vannes in May 2018. He is the son of former Wales dual-code rugby international player Paul Ringer, and brother of former Welsh Rugby Union and Dragons player Jamie Ringer.

He is a tighthead prop.

References 

Ringer Joins Toulon 

Ringer Joins Up With RGC 

RGC Snap Up Prop Ringer 

Joel Ringer Starts Up Save Our Sighthounds Dog Charity 

CAVC Captain Joins Toulon 

ex-Cardiff Blues Teenager to Join Toulon 

Jamie Ringer Dragons Profile 

1996 births
Living people
RC Toulonnais players
Rugby union players from Cardiff
Welsh rugby union players
Rugby union props